White Man is a lost 1924 American silent drama film directed by Louis J. Gasnier and is set in a diamond mine in South Africa. It was Clark Gable's film debut.

Plot
As described in a review in a film magazine, about to be married to a wealthy South African mine owner whom she does not love, Lady Andrea Pellor (Joyce) rebels after she gets her bridal gown on, and seeing an airplane on the beach begs the aviator (Harlan) to take her away. He consents and takes her to his home in the jungle, where she is forced to stay, as the henchmen of his enemy the River Pirate (Long) have splintered the propeller and it takes weeks to send for a new one. The hero is a disappointed, disillusioned man seeking to forget and is only known as White Man. He respects her but treats her with a touch of brutality. Lady Andrea contracts jungle fever and he nurses her back to health, and they love each other but her training makes her hide it. The River Pirate pays them a visit and after a fight kidnaps Lady Andrea. White Man goes in his airplane, crashes through the roof of the house and rescues her. He then takes her back to civilization. He follows and turns out to be her brother’s war buddy. Finally she confesses her love as he is about to return to the jungle.

Cast
Kenneth Harlan as White Man 
Alice Joyce as Lady Andrea Pellor 
Walter Long as The River Thief 
Clark Gable as Lady Andrea's Brother 
Stanton Heck as Mark Hammer

See also
List of lost films

References

External links

1924 films
American silent feature films
1924 drama films
Films directed by Louis J. Gasnier
American black-and-white films
Silent American drama films
Films produced by B. P. Schulberg
Lost American films
1924 lost films
Lost drama films
Preferred Pictures films
1920s American films